William Wadsworth may refer to:

William Wadsworth (patriarch) (1594–1675), First Townsman and founder of Hartford, Connecticut
William Wadsworth (officer) (1765–;1833), Brigadier General in the New York State militia, before and during the War of 1812
William H. Wadsworth (1821–1893), U.S. Representative from Kentucky
William Wadsworth (cricketer) (1823–1891), English cricketer
William Wadsworth (actor) (1874–1950), American silent film actor
William Wadsworth (rower) (1875–1971), Canadian rower who won a silver medal at the 1904 Summer Olympics
William J. Wadsworth (died 1949), municipal politician in Toronto, Canada
William Wadsworth (poet) (born 1950), American poet